Eduardo Pedro Reis Silva, known as Pedro Reis (born 30 June 1967) is a Portuguese football coach and a former player. He is currently managing the Under-19 squad of Salgueiros.

He played seasons 11 seasons and 340 games in the Primeira Liga for Salgueiros.

Club career
He made his Primeira Liga debut for Salgueiros on 23 August 1987 in a game against Chaves.

References

1967 births
Sportspeople from Matosinhos
Living people
Portuguese footballers
Leça F.C. players
S.C. Salgueiros players
Primeira Liga players
Portuguese football managers
S.C. Salgueiros managers
Association football defenders